Vladimir Klepinin (born 2 August 1971) is a Kazakhstani speed skater. He competed at the 1994 Winter Olympics and the 1998 Winter Olympics.

References

1971 births
Living people
Kazakhstani male speed skaters
Olympic speed skaters of Kazakhstan
Speed skaters at the 1994 Winter Olympics
Speed skaters at the 1998 Winter Olympics
Place of birth missing (living people)
Speed skaters at the 1996 Asian Winter Games
20th-century Kazakhstani people